Julie Sheehan (born in Iowa) is an American poet.

Life
She graduated from Yale University, and Columbia University.

She lives in Long Island, New York, with her son, and is currently Director of the MFA in Creative Writing & Literature program as well as an assistant professor at Stony Brook Southampton.

Her work has appeared in Ploughshares, Paris Review, Southwest Review, Texas Review and Western Humanities Review.

Awards
 2009 New York Foundation for the Arts fellowship in poetry
 2008 Whiting Award
 2005 Barnard Women Poets Prize
 Bernard F. Conners Prize for Poetry, Paris Review
 Robert H. Winner Memorial Award, Poetry Society of America.
 Poets Out Loud Prize

Works
 "Dependent Clause", Huffington Post
 "Ash Grove of Ash", Drunken boat

Anthologies

References

External links
Profile at The Whiting Foundation
'A Review of Julie Sheehan’s "Bar Book"', Fogged Clarity, Scott Hightower

Year of birth missing (living people)
Living people
21st-century American poets
English emigrants to the United States
Yale University alumni
Columbia University alumni
Hamilton College (New York) faculty
American women poets
21st-century American women writers
People from Long Island
American women academics